is a Japanese singer, actor, tarento, and professional wrestler. He is a former member of Hikaru Genji (later changed the name to Hikaru Genji Super 5).

Yamamoto graduated from Hachioji-shi Linnan Middle School and Sumida Industrial High School. Yamamoto is currently represented with Wing Run.

Participated units in Johnny's career
Hikaru Genji
Shōnen Gosanke
Hikaru Genji Super 5
Say-S
Junichi & J Jr

Discography

Singles

Mini albums

Albums

Filmography

Variety shows

Films

Stage

Radio

Internet

Advertisements

Bibliography

References

External links
 (2014– ) 

Japanese idols
1972 births
Living people
Johnny & Associates
Musicians from Hachiōji, Tokyo
21st-century Japanese singers
21st-century Japanese male singers